Hua He (219–278), courtesy name Yongxian, was an official and historian of the state of Eastern Wu during the late Three Kingdoms period of China. Hua He served mainly under the fourth and last Wu ruler, Sun Hao, but ended up being dismissed from office in 275 because he opposed Sun Hao's radical policies and outrageous behaviour. Hua He then went to live in seclusion as a result of this event.

See also
 Lists of people of the Three Kingdoms

References

 Chen, Shou (3rd century). Records of the Three Kingdoms (Sanguozhi).
 Pei, Songzhi (5th century). Annotations to Records of the Three Kingdoms (Sanguozhi zhu).

219 births
3rd-century deaths
Eastern Wu politicians
Writers from Changzhou
Politicians from Changzhou
Eastern Wu historians
Historians from Jiangsu
3rd-century Chinese historians